Azar (Persian: آذر) is the ninth month of the Solar Hijri calendar (used in Iran and Afghanistan).

Azar may refer to:

Months
Ādhār (Arabic: آذَار), or azar, an Arabic name of the calendar month of March		
Adar (Hebrew: אֲדָר), a month in the Hebrew calendar, roughly corresponding to March

People
Azar (name), a given name and surname, including a list of persons with the name

Other uses
Azar, Iran, or Azaran
Azar Motor Industrial Co, an Iranian truck manufacturer

See also

Atar, the Zoroastrian concept of holy fire
AzarAb Industries, a large Iranian manufacturer 
Azerbaijan (disambiguation)
Visceral leishmaniasis, or kala-azar, a disease